The Teenage Mutant Ninja Turtles are a group of anthropomorphic mutated turtles that originated in comic books. Lists of Teenage Mutant Ninja Turtles episodes include:

 List of Teenage Mutant Ninja Turtles (1987 TV series) episodes
 List of Ninja Turtles: The Next Mutation episodes
 List of Teenage Mutant Ninja Turtles (2003 TV series) episodes
 List of Teenage Mutant Ninja Turtles (2012 TV series) episodes
 List of Rise of the Teenage Mutant Ninja Turtles episodes

See also
 Teenage Mutant Ninja Turtles (disambiguation)